Oliver Marcy (February 13, 1820 – March 19, 1899) was twice an acting president at Northwestern University from 1876-1881 and in 1890.

Biography
Oliver Marcy was born in Colrain, Massachusetts on February 13, 1820, the seventh of 11 children. He attended Wesleyan Academy and graduated from Wesleyan University in 1846. 

He became professor of natural science at Northwestern University in 1862 and taught there for 37 years and held a number of faculty posts. 

Marcy established the Northwestern University Museum of Natural History and served as its curator from 1871 to his death. He also held several administrative positions at Northwestern. He was Dean of the College of Technology from 1873 to 1876 and Dean of the College of Liberal Arts from 1890 to 1899. Twice he served as Acting President of the University, from 1876 to 1881 and again from May to September 1890.

Marcy married Elizabeth Eunice Smith in 1874. They had four children of whom only one, Annie, survived. Mrs. Marcy was very active in temperance causes and Methodist social work; Chicago's Methodist-sponsored settlement house, the Marcy Center, was named in her honor.

Marcy died at his home in Evanston, Illinois on March 19, 1899. He and his wife are buried at Woodland Dell Cemetery in Wilbraham, Massachusetts.

References

External links
 
Photo of Oliver Marcy
Northwestern University archives

1820 births
1899 deaths
People from Colrain, Massachusetts
Wesleyan University alumni
Northwestern University faculty
Presidents of Northwestern University